Hayesville High School is a school located in Hayesville, North Carolina and is part of the Clay County School District. According to their website, they have a current enrollment of 400 students and 37 teaching staff members. That is an average of 10.8 students per teacher.

References

Educational institutions in the United States with year of establishment missing
Public high schools in North Carolina
Schools in Clay County, North Carolina